The Plant Cell is a monthly peer-reviewed scientific journal of plant sciences, especially the areas of cell and molecular biology, genetics, development, and evolution. It is published by the American Society of Plant Biologists. The editor-in-chief is Blake Meyers (Donald Danforth Plant Science Center). The journal was established in 1989, with Robert (Bob) Goldberg (University of California, Los Angeles) as  founding editor-in-chief.

According to the Journal Citation Reports, the journal has a 2021 impact factor of 12.085.

In October 2009, The Plant Cell introduced Teaching Tools in Plant Biology, a new online feature consisting of materials to help instructors teach plant biology courses. Each topic includes a short essay introducing the topic, with suggested further reading, and a PowerPoint lecture with handouts.

Editors
The following people are or have been editors-in-chief:

References

External links

Botany journals
Monthly journals
English-language journals
Publications established in 1989